The women's 100 metres event at the 2014 Asian Games was held at the Incheon Asiad Main Stadium, Incheon, South Korea on 27–28 September.

Schedule
All times are Korea Standard Time (UTC+09:00)

Records

Results

Round 1
 Qualification: First 2 in each heat (Q) and the next 2 fastest (q) advance to the final.

Heat 1 
 Wind: −0.3 m/s

Heat 2 
 Wind: −0.6 m/s

Heat 3 
 Wind: −0.5 m/s

Final
 Wind: −0.5 m/s

References

Results

100 metres women
2014 women